Mesotroea cyanipennis is a species of beetle in the family Cerambycidae, and the only species in the genus Mesotroea. It was described by Breuning in 1939.

It's 9–9.5 mm long and 3 mm wide, and its type locality is Aneityum, Vanuatu.

References

Desmiphorini
Beetles described in 1939
Taxa named by Stephan von Breuning (entomologist)
Monotypic beetle genera